Tatiana Ortiz Galicia (born January 12, 1984, in Mexico City) is a Mexican athlete who competes in diving and represented Mexico at the 2008 Summer Olympics in Beijing, where she won a bronze medal in the 10m Synchronized Platform with Paola Espinosa.

References
sports-reference

1984 births
Living people
Mexican female divers
Divers at the 2007 Pan American Games
Divers at the 2008 Summer Olympics
Divers at the 2011 Pan American Games
Olympic divers of Mexico
Olympic bronze medalists for Mexico
Divers from Mexico City
Olympic medalists in diving
Medalists at the 2008 Summer Olympics
Pan American Games silver medalists for Mexico
Pan American Games medalists in diving
Universiade medalists in diving
Central American and Caribbean Games gold medalists for Mexico
Competitors at the 2006 Central American and Caribbean Games
Universiade gold medalists for Mexico
Universiade silver medalists for Mexico
Central American and Caribbean Games medalists in diving
Medalists at the 2007 Summer Universiade
Medalists at the 2011 Summer Universiade
Medalists at the 2011 Pan American Games
20th-century Mexican women
21st-century Mexican women